Dashiell Eaves is an American actor.  He lives in New York City.

Theater
Eaves began his professional career in 1993 at age nineteen when he joined the original American cast of the Off-Broadway percussion show Stomp.  Three years later he left that show after being cast as the Courier in Roundabout Theatre Company's revival of  1776.  Since then he has appeared in other Broadway productions, The Sound of Music (Rolf), James Joyce's The Dead (Michael), The Lieutenant of Inishmore (Joey), Martin McDonagh's A Behanding in Spokane as Thomas Ledbury in the 2007 production of Helen Edmundson's Coram Boy at the Imperial Theatre, “A Time to Kill”, as Bob Cratchit in “A Christmas Carol“ directed by Matthew Warchus, and in “Sing Street“, a rock musical based on the Irish film by the same name.

Eaves has appeared Off-Broadway in Lynn Nottage’s “Fabulation” at Signature Theater, Luck of the Irish at LCT3 (Lincoln Center), The Lieutenant of Inishmore at Atlantic Theater Company, Frank McGuinness' Observe the Sons of Ulster Marching Towards the Somme at Lincoln Center and James Joyce's The Dead and Quincy Long's People Be Heard at Playwrights Horizons.

Regionally, Eaves' credits include "The Wild Duck" and "Judgement Day" at Bard Summerscape, and Brendan at the Huntington Theater.  He has appeared at the Williamstown Theatre Festival in A Midsummer Night's Dream (Lysander), Elmer Rice's Street Scene, and Ellen Melaver's Not Waving.  He was part of Martha Clarke's production of Hans Christian Andersen at A.C.T. in San Francisco.  He was also in the first developmental production of The 25th Annual Putnam County Spelling Bee at Barrington Stage Company, playing the role of Mitch the "Comfort Counselor".

Film and television
Eaves' screen credits include “Mindhunter”, “Law & Order: SVU”, “Gotham”, The Good Wife, Blue Bloods episode "Baggage" and Law & Order: Criminal Intent episode "Masquerade" with Bill Irwin and Liza Minnelli.  Other TV and film work includes Luc Besson's Arthur and the Invisibles III, Jonathan Demme's Beloved, the HBO film Stomp Out Loud, and Third Watch.

References

External links
 
 
 Lortel Archives Internet Off-Broadway Database

1974 births
Living people
Male actors from Albuquerque, New Mexico
American male film actors
American male musical theatre actors
American male stage actors
American male television actors
Male actors from New Mexico
Male actors from New York City
Tisch School of the Arts alumni
Male actors from Rochester, New York